Saepuloh Maulana (born 22 December 1988) is an Indonesian professional footballer who plays as a defender for Liga 1 club Persikabo 1973. He previously plays for Mitra Kukar and He appeared for Semen Padang in the 2013 AFC Cup.

Honours

Club
Semen Padang
Indonesia Premier League: 2011-12
Indonesian Community Shield: 2013

References

External links 
 
 Saepuloh Maulana at Liga Indonesia

1988 births
Living people
Indonesian footballers
Sportspeople from West Java
People from Bogor
Liga 1 (Indonesia) players
Liga 2 (Indonesia) players
Indonesian Premier League players
Indonesian Premier Division players
Association football fullbacks
Association football defenders
Persikabo Bogor players
Semen Padang F.C. players
Mitra Kukar players
Sriwijaya F.C. players
Persib Bandung players
Badak Lampung F.C. players
Muba Babel United F.C. players
Persikabo 1973 players